Maksim Manko (Russian: Максим Манько, Spanish: Maksim Mankó; born 11 May 1989 in Ukraine) is a New Zealand footballer who currently plays for NRFL Division 1 club Onehunga-Mangere United.

Career

In 2012, he signed for Sportivo Dock Sud.
In 2013, Manko signed for Santos de Guápiles. Kn 2014, he signed for Waitakere United.

References

New Zealand association footballers
Ukrainian footballers
Association football midfielders
Association football forwards
1989 births
Living people
WaiBOP United players
Waitakere United players
Sportivo Dock Sud players
Santos de Guápiles footballers